Luminiţa Liliana Dobrescu (born 19 April 1971 in Reşiţa) is a retired Romanian freestyle swimmer who won four medals at the 1987, 1991 and 1993 European Aquatics Championships. She also participated in the 1988, 1992 and 1996 Summer Olympics in various individual freestyle and team relay events; her best achievement was fifth place in the 200 m freestyle in 1988. Between 1986 and 1993, she won seven national titles.

Education and career
Dobrescu graduated from the Faculty of Physical Education and Sport of the West University of Timișoara. She retired from competitive swimming around 1997, and worked as lifeguard and swimming coach. In September 2008, she received the title of Honorary Citizen of Reşiţa.

References

1971 births
Living people
West University of Timișoara alumni
Olympic swimmers of Romania
Swimmers at the 1988 Summer Olympics
Swimmers at the 1992 Summer Olympics
Swimmers at the 1996 Summer Olympics
Romanian female freestyle swimmers
European Aquatics Championships medalists in swimming
Universiade medalists in swimming
Universiade silver medalists for Romania
Universiade bronze medalists for Romania
Medalists at the 1997 Summer Universiade